Sergey Alexandrovich Korovushkin (born 26 January 1979) is a former professional association football player from Russia.

He made his debut in the Russian Premier League in 1997 for PFC CSKA Moscow.

Honours
Russian Premier League runner-up: 1999
Russian Second Division Zone West top scorer: 2003 (25 goals)

References

1979 births
Living people
People from Konakovsky District
Russian footballers
PFC CSKA Moscow players
FC Moscow players
FC Torpedo Moscow players
FC Baltika Kaliningrad players
FC Lokomotiv Nizhny Novgorod players
Russian Premier League players
FC Nizhny Novgorod (2007) players
FC Arsenal Tula players
Association football forwards
FC Avangard Kursk players
FC Lokomotiv Moscow players
Sportspeople from Tver Oblast